The 2014 Illinois Fighting Illini football team represented the University of Illinois at Urbana–Champaign in the 2014 NCAA Division I FBS football season. They were led by third-year head coach Tim Beckman, and played their home games at Memorial Stadium. They were members of the new West Division of the Big Ten Conference. They finished the season 6–7, 3–5 in Big Ten play to finish in a tie for fifth place in the West Division. They were invited to the Heart of Dallas Bowl where they lost to Louisiana Tech.

Personnel

Coaching staff

Roster

Schedule

Schedule Source:

Game summaries

Youngstown State

Western Kentucky

Washington

Texas State

Nebraska

Purdue

Wisconsin

Minnesota

Ohio State

Iowa

Penn State

Northwestern

    
    
    
    
    
    
    
    
    
    
    
    
    

Reilly O'Toole passed for 147 yards and three touchdowns while also rushing for 147 yards.

Louisiana Tech–Heart of Dallas Bowl

References

Illinois
Illinois Fighting Illini football seasons
Illinois Fighting Illini football